This is a list of clubs that play Australian rules football in Australia at the senior level.
Guide to abbreviations:
 FC = Football Club
 AFC = Australian Football Club (mainly used if in Queensland or NSW or outside Australia) / Amateur Football Club (mainly used in the other Australian States)
 ARFC = Australian Rules Football Club

Australia

National Level

Australian Football League

AFL Women's

State Level

Victorian Football League

South Australian National Football League

West Australian Football League

Tasmanian State League

Northern Territory Football League

Victoria

AFL Victoria

Eastern Football League

 Balwyn Football Club
 Bayswater Football Club
 Belgrave Football Club
 Blackburn Football Club
 Boronia Football Club
 Chirnside Park Football Club
 Coldstream Football Club
 Croydon Football Club
 Doncaster Football Club
 Doncaster East Football Club
 Donvale Football Club
 East Burwood Football Club
 East Ringwood Football Club
 Fair Park Football Club
 Ferntree Gully Football Club
 Forest Hill Football Club
 Heathmont Football Club
 Kilsyth Football Club
 Knox Football Club
 Lilydale Football Club
 Mitcham Football Club
 Montrose Football Club
 Mooroolbark Football Club
 Mulgrave Football Club
 Noble Park Football Club
 North Ringwood Football Club
 Norwood Football Club
 Nunawading Football Club
 Park Orchards Football Club
 Ringwood Football Club
 Rowville Football Club
 Scoresby Football Club
 Silvan Football Club
 South Belgrave Football Club
 South Croydon Football Club
 Surrey Park Football Club
 Templestowe Football Club
 The Basin Football Club
 Upper Ferntree Gully Football Club
 Vermont Football Club
 Wantirna South Football Club
 Warrandyte Football Club
 Waverley Blues Football Club
 Whitehorse Pioneers Football Club

Essendon District Football League

 Aberfeldie Football Club
 Airport West Football Club
 Avondale Heights Football Club
 Burnside Heights Football Club
 Coburg Districts Football Club
 Craigieburn Football Club
 Doutta Stars Football Club
 East Keilor Football Club
 Glenroy Football Club
 Greenvale Football Club
 Hadfield Football Club
 Hillside Football Club
 Jacana Football Club
 Keilor Football Club
 Maribyrnong Park Football Club
 Moonee Valley Football Club
 Northern Saints Football Club
 Oak Park Football Club
 Pascoe Vale Football Club
 Roxburgh Park Football Club
 Strathmore Football Club
 Taylors Lakes Football Club
 Tullamarine Football Club
 West Coburg Football Club
 Westmeadows Football Club

Northern Football League

 Banyule Football Club
 Bundoora Football Club
 Eltham Football Club
 Epping Football Club
 Diamond Creek Football Club
 Fitzroy Stars Football Club
 Greensborough Football Club
 Heidelberg Football Club
 Heidelberg West Football Club
 Hurstbridge Football Club
 Kilmore Football Club
 Lalor Football Club
 Laurimar Football Club
 Lower Plenty Football Club
 Macleod Football Club
 Mernda Football Club
 Montmorency Football Club
 North Heidelberg Football Club
 Northcote Park Football Club
 Panton Hill Football Club
 Reservoir Football Club
 St Mary's Senior Football Club
 South Morang Football Club
 Thomastown Football Club
 Watsonia Football Club
 West Preston Lakeside Football Club
 Whittlesea Football Club

Southern Football League (Victoria)

 Ashwood Football Club
 Bentleigh Football Club
 Black Rock Football Club
 Carrum Patterson Lakes Football Club
 Caulfield Football Club
 Cerberus Football Club
 Chelsea Heights Football Club
 Cheltenham Football Club
 Clayton Football Club
 Dandenong Demons Football Club
 Dingley Football Club
 Doveton Eagles Football Club
 East Brighton Football Club
 East Malvern Football Club
 Endeavour Hills Football Club
 Frankston Dolphins Football Club
 Hallam Football Club
 Hampton Football Club
 Hampton Park Football Club
 Heatherton Football Club
 Highett Football Club
 Keysborough Football Club
 Lyndale Football Club
 Lyndhurst Football Club
 Moorabbin Kangaroos Football Club
 Mordialloc Football Club
 Mount Waverley Football Club
 Murrumbeena Football Club
 Oakleigh District Football Club
 Port Colts Football Club
 St Kilda City Football Club
 St Pauls-East Bentleigh Football Club
 Sandown Cobras Football Club
 Skye Football Club
 South Yarra Football Club
 Springvale District Football Club

Victorian Amateur Football Association

 AJAX Football Club
 Albert Park Football Club
 Aquinas Old Collegians
 Beaumaris Football Club
 Box Hill North Football Club
 Bulleen-Templestowe Football Club
 Canterbury Football Club
 Caulfield Grammarians Football Club
 Collegians Football Club
 De La Salle Old Collegians
 Eley Park Football Club
 Elsternwick Football Club
 Eltham Old Collegians
 Emmaus St Leo's Old Collegians Football Club
 Fitzroy Football Club
 Glen Eira Amateur Football Club
 Hampton Rovers Football Club
 Hawthorn Amateur Football Club
 Ivanhoe Assumption Football Club
 Kew Football Club
 La Trobe University Football Club
 Manningham Amateur Football Club
 Marcellin Old Collegians
 Masala Football Club
 Mazenod Old Collegians
 Melbourne High School Old Boys
 Monash Blues
 Mount Lilydale Football Club
 North Brunswick Football Club
 North Old Boys/St Pats
 Oakleigh Amateur Football Club
 Old Brighton Grammarians
 Old Camberwell Grammarians
 Old Carey Grammarians
 Old Geelong
 Old Haileyburians
 Old Ivanhoe Grammarians
 Old Melburnians
 Old Mentonians
 Old Paradians
 Old Scotch
 Old Trinity Grammarians
 Old Westbourne
 Ormond Amateur Football Club
 Parkdale Vultures
 Parkside Football Club
 PEGS
 Peninsula Old Boys
 Powerhouse Football Club
 Prahran Football Club
 Preston Amateurs Football Club
 Richmond Central Football Club
 St Bedes/Mentone Tigers Football Club
 St Bernards Old Collegians
 St Francis Xavier
 St Johns Old Collegians
 St Kevins Old Boys
 St Mary's/Salesian Football Club
 South Melbourne Districts Football Club
 South Mornington Football Club
 Swinburne Football Club
 Therry Penola Old Boys
 University Blacks
 University Blues
 University High School-Victoria University Football Club
 West Brunswick Football Club
 Whitefriars Old Collegians
 Williamstown CYMS
 Old Xaverians
 Yarra Valley Old Boys

Western Region Football League

 Albanvale Football Club
 Albion Football Club
 Altona Football Club
 Braybrook Football Club
 Caroline Springs Football Club
 Deer Park Football Club
 Glen Orden Football Club
 Hoppers Crossing Football Club
 Laverton Magpies Football Club
 Manor Lakes Football Club
 Newport Power Football Club
 North Footscray Football Club
 North Sunshine Football Club
 Parkside Football Club
 Point Cook Football Club
 Point Cook Centrals Football Club
 Spotswood Football Club
 St Albans Football Club
 Sunshine Football Club
 Sunshine Heights Football Club
 Tarneit Football Club
 Werribee Districts Football Club
 West Footscray Football Club
 Wyndham Suns Football Club
 Wyndhamvale Football Club
 Yarraville Seddon Football Club

Eastern Region Girls Football League

 Bayswater Junior Football Club
 Belgrave Football Netball Club
 Blackburn Junior Football Club
 Chirnside Park Football Club
 Coldstream Football Club
 Croydon Football Club
 Donvale Football Club
 East Burwood Football Club
 East Ringwood Football Club
 Emerald Football Club
 Ferntree Gully Football Club
 Forest Hill Football Club
 Gembrook-Cockatoo Football Club
 Glen Waverly Football Club
 Healsville Football Club
 Heathmont Football Club
 Kilsyth Football Club
 Knox Football Club
 Lilydale Football Club
 Mitcham Football Club
 Monbulk Junior Football Club
 Montrose Football Club
 Mooroolbark Football Club
 Mount Everlyn Football Club
 North Ringwood Football Club
 Norwood Football Club
 Olinda Ferny Creek Football Club Inc.
 Rowville Hawks Football Club
 Rowville Knights Community Football Club
 South Belgrave / Lysterfield Junior Football Club
 The Basin Football Club
 Upper Ferntree Gully Football Club
 Upwey-Tecoma Junior Football Club
 Vermont football Club
 Wandin Football Netball Club
 Waverley Blues Football Club
 Yarra Glen Football Netball Club
 Yarra Junction Football Club

Vic Country (VCFL)

Alberton Football League

 Fish Creek Football Club
 Foster Football Club
 Meeniyan Dumbalk United Football Club
 Stony Creek Football Club
 Tarwin Football Club
 Toora & District Football Club

Ballarat Football League

 Bacchus Marsh Football Club
 Ballarat Football Club
 Darley Football Club
 East Point Football Club
 Lake Wendouree Football Club
 Melton Football Club
 Melton South Football Club
 North Ballarat City Football Club
 Redan Football Club
 Sebastopol Football Club
 Sunbury Football Club

Bellarine Football League

 Anglesea Football Club
 Barwon Heads Football Club
 Drysdale Football Club
 Geelong Amateur Football Club
 Modewarre Football Club
 Newcomb Power Football Club
 Ocean Grove Football Club
 Portarlington Football Club
 Queenscliff Football Club
 Torquay Football Club

Bendigo Football League

 Castlemaine Football Club
 Eaglehawk Football Club
 Gisborne Football Club
 Golden Square Football Club
 Kangaroo Flat Football Club
 Kyneton Football Club
 Maryborough Football Club
 Sandhurst Football Club
 South Bendigo Football Club
 Strathfieldsaye Football Club

Central Highlands Football League

 Ballan Football Club
 Beaufort Football Club
 Bungaree Football Club
 Buninyong Football Club
 Carngham Linton Football Club
 Clunes Football Club
 Creswick Football Club
 Daylesford Football Club
 Dunnstown Football Club
 Gordon Football Club
 Hepburn Football Club
 Learmonth Football Club
 Newlyn Football Club
 Rokewood Corindhap Football Club
 Skipton Football Club
 Springbank Football Club
 Waubra Football Club

Central Murray Football League

 Balranald Football Club
 Cohuna Kangas Football Club
 Kerang Football Club
 Koondrook Barham Football Club
 Lake Boga Football Club
 Mallee Eagles Football Club
 Nyah Nyah West United Football Club
 Swan Hill Football Club
 Tooleybuc Manangatang Football Club
 Tyntynder Football Club
 Woorinen Football Club

Colac & District Football League

 Alvie Football Club
 Apollo Bay Football Club
 Birregurra Football Club
 Colac Imperials Football Club
 Irrewarra-Beeac Football Club
 Lorne Football Club
 Simpson Football Club
 South Colac Football Club
 Otway Districts Football Club
 Western Eagles Football Club

East Gippsland Football League

 Boisdale Briagolong Football Club
 Lakes Entrance Football Club
 Lindenow Football Club
 Lucknow Football Club
 Orbost Snowy Rovers Football Club
 Paynesville Football Club
 Stratford Football Club
 Wy Yung Football Club

Ellinbank & District Football League

 Buln Buln Football Club
 Catani Football Club
 Ellinbank Football Club
 Lang Lang Football Club
 Longwarry Football Club
 Neerim-Neerim South Football Club
 Nilma Darnum Football Club
 Nyora Football Club
 Poowong Football Club
 Warragul Industrials Football Club

Geelong Football League

 Bell Park Football Club
 Colac Football Club
 Geelong West Giants Football Club
 Grovedale Football Club
 Lara Football Club
 Leopold Football Club
 Newtown & Chilwell Football Club
 North Shore Football Club
 South Barwon Football Club
 St Albans Football Club
 St Mary's Football Club
 St Joseph's Football Club

Geelong & District Football League

 Anakie Football Club
 Bannockburn Football Club
 Bell Post Hill Football Club
 Belmont Lions Football Club
 Corio Football Club
 East Geelong Football Club
 Geelong West Giants Football Club
 Inverleigh Football Club
 North Geelong Football Club
 Thomson Football Club
 Winchelsea Football Club
 Werribee Centrals Football Club

Gippsland Football League

 Bairnsdale Football Club
 Drouin Football Club
 Leongatha Football Club
 Maffra Football Club
 Moe Football Club
 Morwell Football Club
 Sale Football Club
 Traralgon Football Club
 Warragul Football Club
 Wonthaggi Power Football Club

Golden Rivers Football League

 Hay Football Club
 Macorna Football Club
 Moulamein Football Club
 Murrabit Football Club
 Nullawil Football Club
 Quambatook Football Club
 Ultima Football Club
 Wakool Football Club
 Wandella Football Club

Goulburn Valley Football League

 Benalla Football Club
 Echuca Football Club
 Euroa Football Club
 Kyabram Football Club
 Mansfield Football Club
 Mooroopna Football Club
 Rochester Football Club
 Seymour Football Club
 Shepparton Football Club
 Shepparton Swans Football Club
 Shepparton United Football Club
 Tatura Football Club

Hampden Football League

 Camperdown Football Club
 Cobden Football Club
 Hamilton Football Club
 Koroit Football Club
 North Warrnambool Football Club
 Port Fairy Football Club
 Portland Football Netball Cricket Club
 South Warrnambool Football Club
 Terang Mortlake Football Club
 Warrnambool Football Club

Heathcote District Football League

 Colbinabbin Football Club
 Elmore Football Club
 Heathcote Football Club
 Huntly Football Club
 Leitchville Gunbower Football Club
 Lockington Bamawm United Football Club
 Mount Pleasant Football Club
 North Bendigo Football Club
 White Hills Football Club

Horsham & District Football League

 Edenhope-Apsley Football Club
 Harrow-Balmoral Football Club
 Jeparit Rainbow Football Club
 Kalkee Football Club
 Laharum Football Club
 Natimuk United Football Club
 Noradjuha-Quantong Football Club
 Pimpinio Football Club
 Rupanyup Football Club
 Stawell Swifts Football Club
 Taylors Lake Football Club

Kyabram & District Football League

 Ardmona Football Club
 Avenel Football Club
 Dookie United Football Club
 Girgarre Football Club
 Lancaster Football Club
 Longwood Football Club
 Merrigum Football Club
 Murchison Football Club
 Nagambie Football Club
 Rushworth Football Club
 Stanhope Football Club
 Tallygaroopna Football Club
 Undera Football Club
 Violet Town Football Club

Loddon Valley Football League

 Bears Lagoon-Serpentine Football Club
 Bridgewater Football Club
 Calivil United Football Club
 Inglewood Football Club
 Marong & District Football Club
 Mitiamo Football Club
 Newbridge Football Club
 Pyramid Hill Football Club
 YCW Football Club

Maryborough Castlemaine District Football League

 Avoca Football Club
 Campbells Creek Football Club
 Carisbrook Football Club
 Dunolly Football Club
 Harcourt Football Club
 Lexton Football Club
 Maldon Football Club
 Maryborough Rovers Football Club
 Natte Bealiba Football Club
 Navarre Football Club
 Newstead Football Club
 Royal Park Football Club
 Talbot Football Club
 Trentham Football Club

Mid Gippsland Football League

 Boolarra Football Club
 Hill End Football Club
 Mirboo North Football Club
 Morwell East Football Club
 Newborough Football Club
 Thorpdale Football Club
 Trafalgar Football Club
 Yallourn Yallourn North Football Club
 Yarragon Football Club
 Yinnar Football Club

Millewa Football League

 Bambill Football Club
 Cardross Football Club
 Gol Gol Football Club
 Meringur Football Club
 Nangiloc Football Club
 Werrimull Football Club

Mininera & District Football League

 Ararat Eagles Football Club
 Caramut Football Club
 Glenthompson-Dunkeld Football Club
 Great Western Football Club
 Hawkesdale-Macarthur Football Club
 Lismore-Derrinallum Football Club
 Moyston-Willaura Football Club
 Penshurst Football Club
 SMW Rovers Football Club
 Tatyoon Football Club
 Wickliffe-Lake Bolac Football Club
 Woorndoo-Mortlake Football Club

Mornington Peninsula Nepean Football League

 Bonbeach Football Club
 Chelsea Football Club
 Crib Point Football Club
 Devon Meadows Football Club
 Dromana Football Club
 Edithvale Aspendale Football Club
 Frankston Bombers Football Club
 Frankston YCW Football Club
 Hastings Football Club
 Karingal Football Club
 Langwarrin Football Club
 Mornington Football Club
 Mount Eliza Football Club
 Pearcedale Football Club
 Pines Football Club
 Red Hill Football Club
 Rosebud Football Club
 Rye Football Club
 Seaford Football Club
 Somerville Football Club
 Sorrento Football Club
 Tyabb Football Club

Murray Football League

 Barooga Football Club
 Cobram Football Club
 Congupna Football Club
 Deniliquin Football Club
 Echuca United Football Club
 Finley Football Club
 Katandra Football Club
 Moama Football Club
 Mulwala Football Club
 Nathalia Football Club
 Numurkah Football Club
 Rumbalara Football Club
 Shepparton East Football Club
 Tongala Football Club
 Tungamah Football Club

North Central Football League

 Birchip-Watchem Football Club
 Boort Football Club
 Charlton Football Club
 Donald Football Club
 St Arnaud Football Club
 Sea Lake Nandaly Football Club
 Wedderburn Football Club
 Wycheproof-Narraport Football Club

North Gippsland Football League

 Churchill Football Club
 Cowwarr Football Club
 Glengarry Football Club
 Gormandale Football Club
 Heyfield Football Club
 Rosedale Football Club
 Sale City Football Club
 Traralgon Tyers United Football Club
 Woodside Football Club
 Yarram Football Club

Omeo & District Football League

 Bruthen Football Club
 Buchan Football Club
 Lindenow South Football Club
 Omeo-Benambra Football Club
 Swan Reach Football Club
 Swifts Creek Football Club

Ovens & King Football League

 Benalla All Blacks Football Club
 Bonnie Doon Football Club
 Bright Football Club
 Glenrowan Football Club
 Goorambat Football Club
 Greta Football Club
 King Valley Football Club
 Milawa Football Club
 Moyhu Football Club
 North Wangaratta Football Club
 Tarrawingee Football Club
 Whorouly Football Club

Ovens & Murray Football League

 Albury Football Club
 Corowa Rutherglen Football Club
 Lavington Football Club
 Myrtleford Football Club
 North Albury Football Club
 Wangaratta Football Club
 Wangaratta Rovers Football Club
 Wodonga Football Club
 Wodonga Raiders Football Club
 Yarrawonga Football Club

Picola & District Football League

 Berrigan Football Club
 Blighty Football Club
 Deniliquin Rovers Football Club
 Jerilderie Football Club
 Katamatite Football Club
 Katunga Football Club
 Mathoura Football Club
 Picola United Football Club
 Rennie Football Club
 Strathmerton Football Club
 Tocumwal Football Club
 Waaia Football Club
 Yarroweyah Football Club

Riddell District Football League

 Broadford Football Club
 Diggers Rest Football Club
 Lancefield Football Club
 Macedon Football Club
 Melton Central Football Club
 Riddell Football Club
 Rockbank Football Club
 Romsey Football Club
 Rupertswood Football Club
 Sunbury Kangaroos Football Club
 Wallan Football Club
 Woodend/Hesket Football Club

South East Football League

 Beaconsfield Football Club
 Berwick Football Club
 Cranbourne Football Club
 Doveton Football Club
 Narre Warren Football Club
 Officer Football Club
 Pakenham Football Club
 Tooradin-Dalmore Football Club

South West District Football League

 Branxholme-Wallacedale Football Club
 Cavendish Football Club
 Coleraine Football Club
 Dartmoor Football Club
 Heathmere Football Club
 Heywood Football Club
 Tyrendarra Football Club
 Westerns Football Club

Sunraysia Football League

 Imperials Football Club
 Irymple Football Club
 Merbein Football Club
 Mildura Football Club
 Ouyen United Football Club
 Red Cliffs Football Club
 Robinvale Euston Football Club
 South Mildura Football Club
 Wentworth Football Club

Tallangatta & District Football League

 Barnawartha Football Club
 Beechworth Football Club
 Chiltern Football Club
 Dederang Mount Beauty Football Club
 Kiewa-Sandy Creek Football Club
 Mitta United Football Club
 Rutherglen Football Club
 Tallangatta Football Club
 Thurgoona Football Club
 Wahgunyah Football Club
 Wodonga Saints Football Club
 Yackandandah Football Club

Upper Murray Football League

 Border Walwa Football Club
 Bullioh Football Club
 Corryong Football Club
 Cudgewa Football Club
 Federal Football Club
 Tumbarumba Football Club

Warrnambool & District Football League

 Allansford Football Club
 Dennington Football Club
 East Warrnambool Football Club
 Kolora-Noorat Football Club
 Merrivale Football Club
 Nirranda Football Club
 Old Collegians Football Club
 Panmure Football Club
 Russell's Creek Football Club
 South Rovers Football Club
 Timboon Demons Football Club

Wimmera Football League

 Ararat Football Club
 Dimboola Football Club
 Horsham Demons Football Club
 Horsham Saints Football Club
 Minyip Murtoa Football Club
 Nhill Football Club
 Southern Mallee Giants Football Club
 Stawell Football Club
 Warracknabeal Football Club

Yarra Valley Mountain District Football League

 Alexandra Football Club
 Belgrave Football Club
 Emerald Football Club
 Gembrook-Cockatoo Football Club
 Healesville Football Club
 Kinglake Football Club
 Monbulk Football Club
 Mount Evelyn Football Club
 Olinda-Ferny Creek Football Club
 Powelltown Football Club
 Seville Football Club
 Thornton-Eildon Football Club
 Upwey-Tecoma Football Club
 Wandin Football Club
 Warbuton-Millgrove Football Club
 Woori Yallock Football Club
 Yarra Glen Football Club
 Yarra Junction Football Club
 Yea Football Club

Statewide Under 18

NAB League 

 Bendigo Pioneers
 Calder Cannons
 Dandenong Stingrays
 Eastern Ranges
 Geelong Falcons
 Gippsland Power
 Murray Bushrangers
 North Ballarat Rebels
 Northern Knights
 Oakleigh Chargers
 Sandringham Dragons
 Western Jets

South Australia

Adelaide Football League

 Adelaide Lutheran Football Club
 Adelaide University Football Club
 Athelstone Football Club
 Blackfriars Old Scholars Football Club
 Brahma Lodge Football Club
 Brighton Districts and Old Scholars Football Club
 Broadview Football Club
 Central United Football Club
 Christian Brothers College Old Collegians Football Club
 Colonel Light Gardens Football Club
 Eastern Park Football Club
 Edwardstown Football Club
 Elizabeth Football Club
 Fitzroy Football Club
 Flinders Park Football Club
 Flinders University Football Club
 Gaza Football Club
 Gepps Cross Football Club
 Glenunga Football Club
 Golden Grove Football Club
 Goodwood Saints Football Club
 Greenacres Football Club
 Hectorville Football Club
 Henley Football Club
 Hope Valley Football Club
 Houghton Districts Football Club
 Ingle Farm Football Club
 Kenilworth Football Club
 Kilburn Football Club
 Lockleys Football Club
 Marion Football Club
 Mawson Lakes Football Club
 Mitcham Football Club
 Mitchell Park Football Club
 Modbury Football Club
 Morphettville Park Football Club
 North Haven Football Club
 O'Sullivan Beach-Lonsdale Football Club
 Old Ignatians Football Club
 Para Hills Football Club
 Payneham Norwood Union Football Club
 Pembroke Old Scholars Football Club
 Plympton Football Club
 PHOS Camden Football Club
 Pooraka Football Club
 Port District Football Club
 Portland Football Club
 Prince Alfred Old Collegians Football Club
 Pulteney Football Club
 Rosewater Football Club
 Rostrevor Old Collegians Football Club
 Sacred Heart Old Collegians Football Club
 SMOSH West Lakes Football Club
 St Pauls Old Scholars Football Club
 St Peter's Old Collegians Football Club
 Salisbury Football Club
 Salisbury West Football Club
 Scotch Old Collegians Football Club
 Seaton Ramblers Football Club
 Smithfield Football Club
 Tea Tree Gully Football Club
 Trinity Old Scholars Football Club
 Unley Mercedes Jets Football Club
 Walkerville Football Club
 West Croydon Football Club
 Westminster Old Scholars Football Club
 Woodville South Football Club

Adelaide Plains Football League

 Angle Vale Football Club
 Balaklava Football Club
 Hamley Bridge Football Club
 Hummocks Watchman Eagles Football Club
 Mallala Football Club
 Two Wells Football Club
 United Football Club
 Virginia Football Club

Barossa Light & Gawler Football Association

 Angaston Football Club
 Barossa District Football Club
 Freeling Football Club
 Gawler Central Football Club
 Kapunda Football Club
 Nuriootpa Football Club
 South Gawler Football Club
 Tanunda Football Club
 Willaston Football Club

Eastern Eyre Football League

 Cleve Football Club
 Cowell Football Club
 Eastern Ranges Football Club
 Kimba Districts Football Club

Far North Football League

 East Roxby Football Club
 Hornridge Football Club
 Olympic Dam Football Club
 Roxby Districts Football Club

Far West Football League

 Blues Football Club
 Koonibba Football Club
 Thevenard Football Club
 Western United Football Club

Great Flinders Football League

 Cummins Kapinnie Football Club
 Eyre United Football Club
 Lock Football Club
 Ramblers Football Club
 Tumby Bay Football Club
 United Yeelanna Football Club

Great Southern Football League

 Encounter Bay Football Club
 Goolwa-Port Elliot Football Club
 Langhorne Creek Football Club
 McLaren Football Club
 Mount Compass Football Club
 Myponga-Sellicks Football Club
 Strathalbyn Football Club
 Victor Harbor Football Club
 Willunga Football Club
 Yankalilla Football Club

Hills Football League

 Birdwood Football Club
 Blackwood Football Club
 Bridgewater-Callington Football Club
 Echunga Football Club
 Gumeracha Football Club
 Hahndorf Football Club
 Ironbank-Cherry Gardens Football Club
 Kangarilla Football Club
 Kersbrook Football Club
 Lobethal Football Club
 Macclesfield Football Club
 Meadows Football Club
 Mount Barker Football Club
 Mount Lofty District Football Club
 Nairne Bremer United Football Club
 Onkaparinga Valley Football Club
 Torrens Valley Football Club
 Uraidla Districts Football Club

Kangaroo Island Football League

 Dudley United Football Club
 Kingscote Football Club
 Parndana Football Club
 Western Districts Football Club
 Wisanger Football Club

Kowree-Naracoorte-Tatiara Football League

 Border Districts Football Club
 Bordertown Football Club
 Keith Football Club
 Kaniva-Leeor United Football Club
 Kingston Football Club
 Kybybolite Football Club
 Lucindale Football Club
 Mundulla Football Club
 Naracoorte Football Club
 Padthaway Football Club
 Penola Football Club

Mallee Football League

 Border Downs Tintinara Football Club
 Karoonda Football Club
 Lameroo Football Club
 Murrayville Football Club
 Peake & District Football Club
 Pinnaroo Football Club

Mid South Eastern Football League

 Glencoe Football Club
 Hatherleigh Football Club
 Kalangadoo Football Club
 Kongorong Football Club
 Mount Burr Football Club
 Nangwarry Football Club
 Port MacDonnell Football Club
 Robe Football Club
 Tantanoola Football Club

Mid West Football League

 Central Eyre Football Club
 Elliston Football Club
 West Coast Hawks Football Club
 Western Districts Football Club
 Wirrulla Football Club
 Wudinna Football Club

North Eastern Football League

 Blyth Snowtown Football Club
 Brinkworth Spalding Redhill Football Club
 Burra Booborowie Hallett Football Club
 Eudunda-Robertstown Football Club
 Mintaro Manoora Football Club
 North Clare Football Club
 Riverton Saddleworth Marrabel United Football Club
 South Clare Football Club

Northern Areas Football Association

 Booleroo Melrose Wilmington Football Club
 Broughton Mundoora Football Club
 Crystal Brook Football Club
 Jamestown Peterborough Football Club
 Orroroo Football Club
 Southern Flinders Football Club

Port Lincoln Football League

 Boston Football Club
 Lincoln South Football Club
 Mallee Park Football Club
 Marble Range Football Club
 Tasman Football Club
 Wayback Football Club

Riverland Football League

 Barmera-Monash Football Club
 Berri Football Club
 Blanchetown-Swan Reach Football Club
 Browns Well Football Club
 Cobdogla Football Club
 Loxton Football Club
 Loxton North Football Club
 Lyrup Football Club
 Paringa Football Club
 Ramco Football Club
 Renmark Football Club
 Sedan Cambrai Football Club
 Waikerie Football Club
 Wunkar Football Club

River Murray Football League

 Imperial Football Club
 Jervois Football Club
 Mannum Football Club
 Meningie Football Club
 Mypolonga Football Club
 Rambler Football Club
 Tailem Bend Football Club

Southern Football League

 Aldinga Football Club
 Christies Beach Football Club
 Cove Football Club
 Flagstaff Hill Football Club
 Happy Valley Football Club
 Morphett Vale Football Club
 Noarlunga Football Club
 Port Noarlunga Football Club
 Reynella Football Club

Spencer Gulf Football League

 Central Augusta Football Club
 Lions Football Club
 Port Football Club
 Solomontown Football Club
 South Augusta Football Club
 West Augusta Football Club

Western Border Football League

 Casterton Sandford Football Club
 East Gambier Football Club
 Millicent Football Club
 North Gambier Football Club
 South Gambier Football Club
 West Gambier Football Club

Whyalla Football League

 Central Whyalla Football Club
 North Whyalla Football Club
 Roopeena Football Club
 South Whyalla Football Club
 Weeroona Bay Football Club
 West Whyalla Football Club

Yorke Peninsula Football League

 Ardrossan Football Club
 Bute Football Club
 Central Yorke Cougars Football Club
 CMS Crows Football Club
 Kadina Football Club
 Moonta Football Club
 Paskeville Football Club
 Southern Eagles Football Club
 Wallaroo Football Club

Western Australia

Western Australian Amateur Football League

 Armadale Football Club
 Ballajura Football Club
 Bassendean Football Club
 Bayswater Football Club
 Belmont Districts Football Club
 Brentwood Booragoon Football Club
 Bull Creek Leeming Football Club
 Canning Vale Football Club
 Canning Vic Park South Perth Football Club
 Carlisle Football Club
 Cockburn Football Club
 Cockburn Lakes Football Club
 Collegians Football Club
 Coolbellup Football Club
 Coolbinia West Perth Football Club
 Cottesloe Football Club
 Dianella Morley Football Club
 Ellenbrook Football Club
 Fremantle CBC Football Club
 Forrestdale Football Club
 Gosnells Football Club
 Hamersley Carine Football Club
 High Wycombe Football Club
 Jandakot Football Club
 Kalamunda Football Club
 Kenwick Football Club
 Kingsley Football Club
 Kingsway Football Club
 Kwinana Football Club
 Lynwood Ferndale Football Club
 Maddington Football Club
 Manning Football Club
 Melville Football Club
 Mosman Park Football Club
 Mount Lawley Football Club
 Nollamara Football Club
 North Beach Football Club
 North Fremantle Football Club
 Ocean Ridge Football Club
 Osborne Park Football Club
 Piara Waters Football Club
 Quinns District Football Club
 Rossmoyne Football Club
 St Norbets Football Club
 Scarborough Football Club
 Secret Harbour Football Club
 Stirling Football Club
 Swan Athletic Football Club
 Swan Valley Football Club
 Thornlie Football Club
 Trinity Aquinas Football Club
 University Football Club
 Wanneroo Football Club
 Warnbro Football Club
 Wembley Football Club
 Wesley Curtin Football Club
 West Coast Cowan Football Club
 Whitford Football Club
 Willetton Football Club
 Yanchep Football Club

Avon Football Association

 Beverley Football Club
 Cunderdin Football Club
 Federals Football Club
 Kellerberrin/Tammin Football Club
 Quairading Football Club
 Railways Football Club
 York Football Club

Central Kimberley Football League

 Bayulu Bulldogs Football Club
 Mowanjum Hawks Football Club
 Muludja Lions Football Club
 Noonkanbah Blues Football Club
 Wangkatjungka Crows Football Club

Central Midlands Coastal Football League

 Dandaragan Football Club
 Cervantes Football Club
 Jurien Bay Football Club
 Lancelin Football Club
 Moora Football Club

Central Wheatbelt Football League

 Beacon Football Club
 Bencubbin Football Club
 Kalannie Football Club
 Koorda Football Club
 Mukinbudin Football Club
 Nungarin Football Club

Eastern Districts Football League

 Bruce Rock Football Club
 Burracoppin Football Club
 Corrigin Football Club
 Hyden/Karlgarin Football Club
 Kulin/Kondinin Football Club
 Narembeen Football Club
 Nukarni Football Club
 Southern Cross Football Club

East Kimberley Football Association

 Bow River Football Club
 Halls Creek Football Club
 Kundat Djaru Football Club
 Kununurra Football Club
 Kururrungku Football Club
 Ord River Football Club
 Waringarri Football Club
 Warmun Football Club
 Wyndham Football Club
 Yardgee Football Club

Esperance District Football Association

 Esperance Football Club
 Gibson Football Club
 Newtown Condingup Football Club
 Ports Football Club

Fortescue National Football League

 Panthers Football Club
 Saints Football Club
 Tigers Football Club
 Towns Football Club

Gascoyne Football Association

 Exmouth Football Club
 Gascoyne Football Club
 Ramblers Football Club
 Warriors Football Club

Goldfields Football League

 Boulder City Football Club
 Kalgoorlie City Football Club
 Kambalda Football Club
 Mines Rovers Football Club
 Railways Football Club

Great Northern Football League

 Brigades Football Club
 Chapman Valley Football Club
 Mullewa Football Club
 Northampton Football Club
 Railway Football Club
 Rovers Football Club
 Towns Football Club

Great Southern Football League

 Albany Football Club
 Denmark Walpole Football Club
 Mount Barker Football Club
 North Albany Football Club
 Railways Football Club
 Royals Football Club

Hills Football Association

 Bullsbrook Football Club
 Chidlow Football Club
 Gidgegannup Football Club
 Mount Helena Football Club
 Mundaring Football Club
 Parkerville Football Club
 Pickering Brook Football Club

Lower South West Football League

 Boyup Brook Football Club
 Bridgetown Football Club
 Deanmill Football Club
 Imperials Football Club
 Kojonup Football Club
 Southerners Football Club
 Tigers Football Club

Mortlock Football League

 Calingiri Football Club
 Dalwallinu Football Club
 Dowerin Wyalkatchem Football Club
 Gingin Football Club
 Goomalling Football Club
 Toodyay Football Club
 Wongan Ballidu Football Club

Newman National Football League

 Centrals Football Club
 Pioneers Football Club
 Saints Football Club
 Tigers Football Club

North Midlands Football League

 Carnamah-Perenjori Football Club
 Coorow-Latham Football Club
 Dongara Football Club
 Mingenew Football Club
 Morawa Football Club
 Three Springs Football Club

North Pilbara Football League

 Dampier Sharks Football Club
 Karratha Falcons Football Club
 Karratha Kats Football Club
 Port Hedland Rovers Football Club
 South Hedland Swans Football Club
 Wickham Wolves Football Club

Ongerup Football Association

 Boxwood Hills Football Club
 Gnowangerup Football Club
 Jerramungup Football Club
 Lake Grace/Pingrup Football Club
 Newdegate Football Club

Ravensthorpe & District Football Association

 Ravensthorpe Tigers Football Club
 Southerners Football Club
 Lakes Football Club

Peel Football League

 Baldivis Football Club
 Centrals Football Club
 Halls Head Football Club
 Mandurah Football Club
 Pinjarra Football Club
 Rockingham Football Club
 South Mandurah Football Club
 Waroona Football Club

South West Football League

 Augusta Margaret River Football Club
 Bunbury Football Club
 Busselton Football Club
 Carey Park Football Club
 Collie Eagles Football Club
 Donnybrook Football Club
 Eaton Boomers Football Club
 Harvey Brunswick Lesch Football Club
 Harvey Bulls Football Club
 South Bunbury Football Club

Upper Great Southern Football League

 Boddington Football Club
 Brookton/Pingelly Football Club
 Katanning Wanderers Football Club
 Kukerin/Dumbleyung Football Club
 Narrogin Hawks Football Club
 Wagin Football Club
 Wickepin Football Club
 Williams Football Club

West Kimberley Football Association

 Towns Football Club
 Broome Bulls Football Club
 Broome Saints Football Club
 Peninsula Bombers Football Club
 Bidyadanga Football Club
 Cable Beach Football Club
 Derby Tigers Football Club
 Looma Eagles Football Club

Tasmania

North West Football League

 Burnie Football Club
 Devonport Football Club
 East Devonport Football Club
 Latrobe Football Club
 Penguin Football Club
 Smithton Football Club
 Ulverstone Football Club
 Wynyard Football Club

Southern Football League

 Brighton Robins
 Claremont Magpies
 Cygnet Football Club
 Dodges Ferry Sharks
 East Coast Bombers
 Huonville Lions
 Hobart Tigers
 Lindisfarne Blues
 New Norfolk Eagles
 Sorell Eagles

Northern Tasmanian Football Association

 Bracknell Football Club
 Bridgenorth Football Club
 Bridport Swans Football Club
 Deloraine Football Club
 East Coast Swans Football Club
 Evandale Football Club
 George Town Football Club
 Hillwood Football Club
 Lilydale Football Club
 Longford Football Club
 Meander Valley Football Club
 Old Launcestonians Football Club
 Old Scotch Football Club
 Perth Football Club
 Rocherlea Football Club
 St. Pat's Football Club
 Scottsdale Football Club
 South Launceston Football Club
 Tamar Cats Football Club
 Uni-Mowbray Football Club

Circular Head Football Association

 Forest-Stanley Football Club
 Irishtown Football Club
 Redpa Football Club
 Scotchtown Football Club

Darwin Football Association

 Cuprona Football Club
 Natone Football Club
 Queenstown Football Club
 Ridgley Football Club
 Somerset Football Club
 South Burnie Football Club
 Yeoman Football Club
 Yolla Football Club

King Island Football Association

 Currie Football Club
 Grassy Football Club
 North Football Club

North Western Football Association

 Forth Football Club
 Motton-Preston Football Club
 Rosebery-Toorak Football Club
 Sheffield Football Club
 Spreyton Football Club
 Turners Beach Football Club
 Wesley Vale Football Club
 West Ulverstone Football Club
 East Ulverstone Football Club

Oatlands District Football Association

 Bothwell Football Club
 Campania Football Club
 Campbell Town Football Club
 Mount Pleasant Football Club
 Oatlands Football Club
 Swansea Football Club
 Woodsdale Football Club

Old Scholars Football Association

 DOSA Football Club
 Hutchins Football Club
 OHA Football Club
 Richmond Football Club
 St. Virgils Football Club
 University Football Club

New South Wales

Sydney AFL

 Balmain Australian Football Club
 Camden Football Club
 Campbelltown Football Club
 East Coast Eagles
 Holroyd-Parramatta Football Club
 Macquarie University Football Club
 Manly-Warringah Football Club
 Newtown Breakaways Football Club
 Nor-West Football Club
 North West Sydney Redbacks Football Club
 North Shore Australian Football Club
 Pennant Hills Football Club
 Penrith Football Club
 Randwick City Saints Football Club
 St George Football Club
 South West Sydney Football Club
 Southern Power Football Club
 Sydney University Australian National Football Club
 UNSW-Eastern Suburbs Bulldogs
 UTS Australian Football Club
 Western Magic Football Club
 Western Suburbs Football Club
 Wollondilly Knights Football Club
 Wollongong Saints Football Club

Black Diamond AFL

 Cardiff Football Club
 Gosford Football Club
 Killarney Vale Football Club
 Lake Macquarie Football Club
 Maitland Football Club
 Muswellbrook Football Club 
 Nelson Bay Football Club 
 Newcastle City Football Club
 Singleton Football Club 
 Terrigal Avoca Football Club
 The Entrance Bateau Bay Football Club
 Wallsend-West Newcastle Football Club
 Warners Bay Football Club
 Wyong Lakes Football Club

Broken Hill Football League

 Central Magpies Football Club
 North Bulldogs Football Club
 South Roos Football Club
 West Robins Football Club

Central West Australian Football League

 Bathurst Bushrangers Football Club
 Bathurst Giants Football Club
 Dubbo Demons Football Club
 Orange Tigers Football Club
 Parkes Panthers Football Club

Farrer Football League

 Barellan United Football Club
 CSU Football Club
 Coleambally Football Club
 East Wagga Kooringal Football Club
 Marrar Football Club
 Northern Jets Football Club
 North Wagga Football Club
 Temora Football Club
 The Rock-Yerong Creek Football Club

Hume Football League

 Billabong Crows Football Club
 Brock/Burrum Saints Football Club
 CDHBU Football Club
 Culcairn Football Club
 Henty Football Club
 Holbrook Football Club
 Howlong Football Club
 Jindera Football Club
 Lockhart Football Club
 Murray Magpies Football Club
 Osborne Football Club
 Rand-Walbundrie-Walla Football Club

North Coast Australian Football League

 Coffs Breakers Football Club
 Grafton Football Club
 Port Macquarie Football Club
 Sawtell Toormina Football Club

North West Australian Football League

 Gunnedah District Bulldogs Football Club
 Inverell Saints Football Club
 Moree Suns Football Club
 Narrabri Eagles Football Club
 New England Nomads Football Club
 Tamworth Kangaroos Football Club
 Tamworth Swans Football Club

Northern Riverina Football League

 Condobolin Milby Football Club
 Hillston Football Club
 Lake Cargelligo Football Club
 Tullibigeal Football Club
 Ungarie Football Club
 West Wyalong Girral Football Club

Riverina Football League

 Collingullie Glenfield Park Football Club
 Coolamon Football Netball Club
 Ganmain Grong Grong Matong Football Club
 Griffith Football Club
 Leeton/Whitton Football Club
 Mangoplah Cookadinia United Eastlakes Football Club
 Narrandera Football Club
 Turvey Park Football Club
 Wagga Tigers Football Club

Sapphire Coast Australian Football League

 Eden Football Club
 Merimbula Football Club
 Narooma Football Club
 Pambula Football Club
 Tathra Football Club

South Coast Australian Football League

 Bomaderry Football Club
 Dapto City Stallions Football Club
 Figtree Kangaroos Football Club
 Kiama Football Club
 Northern Districts Tigers Football Club
 Nowra Albatross Football Club
 Port Kembla Football Club
 Shellharbour City Suns Football Club
 Ulladulla Dockers Football Club
 Wollongong Bulldogs Football Club
 Wollongong Lions Football Club

Australian Capital Territory

AFL Canberra

 Ainslie Football Club
 ADFA Football Club
 ANU Football Club
 Belconnen Magpies Football Club
 Cootamundra Football Club
 Eastlake Football Club
 Googong Hogs Football Club
 Goulburn City Swans Football Club
 Gungahlin Football Club
 Molonglo Football Club
 Queanbeyan Football Club
 Southern Cats Football Club
 Tuggeranong Hawks Football Club
 Woden Blues Football Club
 Yass Football Club

Queensland

Queensland Australian Football League

 Broadbeach Australian Football Club
 Labrador Australian Football Club
 Maroochydore Football Club
 Morningside Australian Football Club
 Mount Gravatt Australian Football Club
 Noosa AFC
 Palm Beach Currumbin
Redland-Victoria Point Sharks
 Sherwood Magpies
 Surfers Paradise Demons
Wilston Grange Gorillas

Queensland Football Association

Divisional Football

 Alexandra Hills Bombers
 Aspley Hornets
 Beenleigh Buffaloes
 Bond University Australian Football Club
 Bribie Island Australian Football Club
 Burleigh Bombers
 Caloundra Panthers
 Carrara Australian Football Club
 Coolangatta Tweed Heads Blues
 Coomera Australian Football Club
 Coorparoo Kings
 Ferny Grove Australian Football Club
 Griffith Uni Moorooka Football Club
 Hinterland Blues Australian Football Club
 Ipswich Cats Australian Football Club
 Ipswich Eagles
 Jindalee Australian Football Club
 Kedron Lions
 Kenmore Australian Football Club
 Marcellin AFC
 Maroochydore Roos
 Mayne Tigers
 Moreton Bay Australian Football Club
 Noosa Tigers
 Park Ridge Australian Football Club
 Pine Rivers Swans
 Redcliffe Tigers
 Robina Roos
 Sandgate Hawks
 Springwood Pumas
 University of Queensland Red Lions
 Victoria Point Australian Football Club
 Wynnum Vikings
 Yeronga South Brisbane Devils

Wide Bay Division

 Across the Waves Australian Football Club
 Brothers Bulldogs Australian Football Club
 Gympie Australian Football Club
 Hervey Bay Bombers Australian Football Club
 Hervey Bay Power Australian Football Club
 Maryborough Australian Football Club

Northern Rivers Division

 Ballina Bombers Australian Football Club
 Byron Magpies Australian Football Club
 Lismore Swans Australian Football Club
 Tweed Coast Tigers Australian Football Club

AFL Cairns

 Cairns City Lions Australian Football Club
 Cairns Saints Australian Football Club
 Centrals Trinity Beach Australian Football Club
 Manunda Hawks Australian Football Club
 North Cairns Australian Football Club
 Port Douglas Australian Football Club
 South Cairns Australian Football Club

AFL Capricornia

 Boyne Island Tannum Sands Saints
 Brothers Rockhampton Roos
 Gladstone Mudcrabs
 Glenmore Bulls
 Rockhampton Panthers
 Yeppoon Swans

AFL Darling Downs

 Chinchilla Suns
 Dalby Swans
 Coolaroo Roos
 Goondiwindi Hawks
 Highfields Lions
 South Burnett Saints
 South Toowoomba Bombers
 Toowoomba Tigers
 University Cougars
 Warwick Redbacks

AFL Mackay

 Eastern Swans
 Mackay Magpies
 Mackay City
 North Mackay
 Whitsunday Sea Eagles

AFL Mount Isa

 Buffaloes
 Dajarra Rhinos
 Lake Nash Young Guns
 Rovers
 Tigers

AFL Townsville

 Curra Swans
 Hermit Park Tigers
 Northern Beaches Lions
 Thuringowa Bulldogs
 University Hawks

Northern Territory

Barkly Australian Football League

 Barkly Work Camp Football Club
 Canteen Creek Football Club
 Eagles Football Club
 Elliot Football Club
 Sporties Spitfires Football Club

Central Australian Football League

 Areyonga Football Club
 Federals Football Club
 Laramba Football Club (Cowboys)
 Ltyentye Apurte Football Club
 MacDonnell Districts Football Club
 Mulga Bore Football Club
 Nyirripi Football Club
 Pioneers Football Club
 Plenty Highway Football Club
 Rovers Football Club
 South Football Club
 Ti Tree Football Club
 Titjikala Football Club
 Western Aranda Football Club
 Wests Football Club
 Yuendumu Football Club

Gove Australian Football League

 Baywarra Football Club
 Djarrak Football Club
 Gopu Football Club
 Nguykal Football Club

Big Rivers Australian Football League

 Beswick Football Club
 Eastside Football Club
 Kalano Football Club
 Katherine Camels Football Club
 Katherine South Football Club
 Tindal Magpies Football Club

Tiwi Islands Football League

 Imalu Football Club
 Muluwurri Football Club
 Pumarali Football Club
 Ranku Football Club
 Tapalinga Football Club
 Tuyu Football Club
 Walama Football Club

See also

List of cricket clubs in Australia
List of baseball teams in Australia
List of rowing clubs in Australia
List of rugby league clubs in Australia
List of rugby union clubs in Australia
List of soccer clubs in Australia
List of yacht clubs in Australia

References

External links

Australia clubs
 
Australian rules football